Ivan Rasmussen (born 23 July 1952) is  a former Australian rules footballer who played with Footscray in the Victorian Football League (VFL).

Notes

External links 
		

Living people
1952 births
Australian rules footballers from Victoria (Australia)
Western Bulldogs players
Leongatha Football Club players